Darius and Girėnas stadium is a multi-use stadium in the Ąžuolynas park in Žaliakalnis district of Kaunas, Lithuania. The all-seater stadium holds about 15,315 people. In 1998 the stadium was renovated according to UEFA regulations, and in 2005 it was modernised with the installation of the biggest stadium television screen in the Baltic states. The latest renovation started in 2018 and ended in 2022. It is the biggest stadium in the Baltic states. It hosts Lithuanian football matches as well as international athletics championships. During a sporting season, about 50 events are held here.

History

The first stadium in this place was designed and established by Steponas Darius and Kęstutis Bulota in 1923, and completed in 1925. In 1935–1936, the stadium was renovated and named the State Stadium. Starting in 1969 the stadium underwent another reconstruction that lasted for 10 years until August 1979. Wooden tribunes were replaced with reinforced concrete structures and placed in a half circle.

After Lithuania regained independence, in 1993 the stadium was named after the Lithuanian pilots Steponas Darius and Stasys Girėnas, who perished in a crash near the end of an attempted non-stop flight from New York to Lithuania. The site is currently the home ground of the football club FK Kauno Žalgiris and FC Stumbras. It is a part of the S. Darius and S. Girėnas sport center, which also includes the nearby Kaunas Sports Hall, built in 1939.

On 23 November 2021, the informal shortening Darius and Girėnas Stadium officially replaced the former name, eliminating the pilots' names from the label.

Reconstruction
In July 2010, talks began that modernizing the stadium is the cheapest option for Lithuania to develop a football stadium that could host international matches. Two thirds of the renovation costs were proposed to be provided by Lithuanian Football Federation. Despite many initiatives to launch the renovation from various groups no actual actions were started, as an agreement for funding and project specifications could not be achieved.

Another attempt to revitalize the stadium was started in February 2016 by the newly elected Kaunas City Municipality which adopted a plan to revamp major sport infrastructure in Kaunas. Early proposals suggested that the seating capacity should be expanded to 12,500–20,000 roof-covered seats, under-soil heating installed, and stadium should reach Category 4 of UEFA stadium classification.

On 18 August 2017, the reconstruction project was officially presented to the public. After the reconstruction, the stadium will have seating capacity of 15,315 for sport events and up to 30,000 for concerts and other events. On 15 June 2018, Kayı Construction and Kaunas City Municipality signed the reconstruction contract. The stadium will be opened after 18–20 months (works will begin in July 2018). The stadium will have Desso GrassMaster surface and completely covered with a roof over the stands.

The stadium was re-opened with the 2022 Lithuanian Football Cup final on 16 October 2022. The reconstruction cost 43 million euros.

See also
 Lithuania National Stadium

References

External links
Official site
Stadium Opening Announcement Press Conference

Sport in Kaunas
Football venues in Lithuania
Lithuania
Buildings and structures in Kaunas
Brutalist architecture
Athletics (track and field) venues in Lithuania
Multi-purpose stadiums in Lithuania
Sports venues completed in 1925
1925 establishments in Lithuania